Parishia is an Asian plant genus in the family Anacardiaceae, subfamily Anacardioideae. It is found in Indo-China and Malesia; no subspecies are listed in the Catalogue of Life. It was named in 1860, by Joseph Dalton Hooker, in honour of the botanist and plant collector Charles Samuel Pollock Parish.

The type species is P. insignis, the first specimens of which were collected by Parish in the Andaman Islands.

Species
The Catalogue of Life lists:
 Parishia coriacea
 Parishia dinghouiana
 Parishia insignis
 Parishia maingayi
 Parishia malabog
 Parishia paucijuga
 Parishia sericea
 Parishia trifoliolata

References

Anacardiaceae
Flora of Indo-China
Flora of Malesia